Digest size is a magazine size, smaller than a conventional or "journal size" magazine but larger than a standard paperback book, approximately , but can also be  and , similar to the size of a DVD case. These sizes have evolved from the printing press operation end. Some printing presses refer to digest size as a "catalog size". The digest format was considered to be a convenient size for readers to tote around or to leave on the coffee table within easy reach.

Examples
The most famous digest-sized magazine is Reader's Digest, from which the size appears to have been named. TV Guide also used the format from its inception in 1953 until 2005. CoffeeHouse Digest is a national magazine distributed free of charge at coffeehouses throughout the United States. Bird Watcher's Digest is an international magazine that has retained the digest size since its creation in 1978.

Digest size is less popular now than it once was. TV Guide dropped it in favor of a larger format. The science fiction magazines Analog and Asimov's had switched to a format slightly larger than digest size several years earlier.  The main publications remaining in digest size now are Reader's Digest, Prevention, Guideposts Magazine and some Archie comics digests. Children's Digest was originally in digest size but switched long ago to a larger format as well (though keeping the word "Digest" in its name). Writer's Digest is another publication with the word in its name that is not actually produced at that size.

Science fiction digests 
Since the 1950s it has also been used by several science fiction magazines including:
Analog (originally Astounding, full magazine size from March 1963 to March 1965)
Isaac Asimov's Science Fiction Magazine
Galaxy Science Fiction
The Magazine of Fantasy & Science Fiction
New Worlds
Other Worlds
Science Fantasy
Worlds of If

Comics digests
From the late 1960s on, several comic book publishers put out "comics digests," consisting mostly if not entirely of reprinted material, usually about  Gold Key Comics produced three digest titles that lasted until the mid-1970s: Golden Comics Digest, Mystery Comics Digest, and Walt Disney Comics Digest. DC Comics produced several in the early 1980s (including DC Special Blue Ribbon Digest and The Best of DC), and Harvey Comics also published a few during the same time (including Richie Rich Digest Magazine). Archie Comics has published numerous comics digests since the 1970s, and in the 2000s Marvel Comics has produced a number of digests, primarily for reprint editions.

The manga graphic novel format is similar to digest size, although slightly narrower and generally thicker.

The A5 paper size used by many UK fanzines is slightly wider and taller than digest size.

In Italy, Topolino's Disney comics title has been published in the format since 1949, inspired by Reader's Digest (which was also published by Arnoldo Mondadori Editore). Also Diabolik and the vast amount of so called fumetti neri for adults are commonly published in this format.

The format is widely used in comics published in Italy, France, Brazil, Mexico, Spain and more countries.

References

Magazine publishing
science fiction magazines
Comics formats